Michał Probierz (born 24 September 1972) is a Polish football manager and former player who manages Poland U21. As a player, he played as a midfielder, spending most of his career with Górnik Zabrze. As a manager, he won both the Polish Cup and the Polish Super Cup twice, with Jagiellonia Białystok in 2010 and with Cracovia in 2020.

Managerial career

Early career and Jagiellonia Białystok
After brief stints at local club Polonia Bytom and also Widzew Łódź, Probierz was appointed manager of Ekstraklasa side Jagiellonia Białystok on 5 July 2008.

He led Jagiellonia to the final of the Polish Cup in the 2009–10 season, their second final appearance in their club history, beating Pogoń Szczecin 1–0 at the Zdzisław Krzyszkowiak Stadium, hence winning their first major Polish trophy. By doing so, Jagiellonia Białystok also qualified for a European competition for the first time ever, entering the 2010–11 UEFA Europa League third qualifying round.

At the start of the 2010–11 season, Probierz guided Jagiellonia Białystok to the Polish Super Cup following a 1–0 victory over Lech Poznań. However, Jagiellonia's European adventure was short-lived as they were eliminated in the third qualifying round by Greek side Aris Thessaloniki, losing 4–3 on aggregate. At the end of the season, he left his managerial role on 22 July 2011.

ŁKS Łódź
On 5 September 2011, Probierz was appointed as the new manager of ŁKS Łódź. His reign at the club lasted just 60 days and six matches, and Probierz announced his departure on 4 November 2011 to join Aris Thessaloniki.

Aris Thessaloniki
Probierz took over as manager of Aris Thessaloniki during the 2011–12 season, taking over after Sakis Tsiolis. Probierz's time there was short and following a string of poor results, he left the club by mutual consent on 5 January 2012.

Wisła Kraków

On 1 March 2012, Probierz moved back to Poland, agreeing to become manager of defending champions Wisła Kraków, replacing Kazimierz Moskal. He resigned on 1 October 2012, with Wisła near the bottom of the table.

GKS Bełchatów
Probierz joined struggling GKS Bełchatów, who were bottom of the Ekstraklasa on 14 November 2012. He only managed four games for them, failing to win any of them as they were eventually relegated, having had three different managers throughout the season, before leaving on 21 December 2012.

Lechia Gdańsk
On 4 June 2013, Probierz agreed to manage Lechia Gdańsk ahead of the 2013–14 season. He stayed until 26 March 2014, where he left the team before they secured a place in the Championship round of games and ended the campaign in fourth place, narrowly missing out on a European spot.

Return to Jagiellonia Białystok
A couple of weeks later after leaving Lechia, Probierz returned to former club Jagiellonia Białystok on 7 April 2014. In his first full season back in charge, he secured a third position in the league table, hence qualifying for the 2015–16 UEFA Europa League first qualifying round. After a poor 2015–16 season, with Jagiellonia ending up in the relegation round, Probierz led the club to their best ever Ekstraklasa season in the 2016–17 season, finishing second behind champions Legia Warsaw. He unexpectedly quit on 4 June 2017.

Cracovia
On 21 June 2017, it was announced that Probierz had signed with Ekstraklasa side Cracovia. He led them to a tenth place in the 2017–18 season but still in the relegation round, Cracovia comfortably topped the group, avoiding relegation to I liga.

The next season saw Probierz lead Cracovia to a fourth place in the championship round, and with 3rd placed Lechia Gdańsk having won the 2018–19 Polish Cup, meant they qualified for the 2019–20 UEFA Europa League first qualifying round. Whilst there, Cracovia exited the competition on away goals after drawing 3–3 on aggregate with Slovak team DAC Dunajská Streda.

In 2020 Probierz led Cracovia to win the 2019–20 Polish Cup, which led to Cracovia qualifying for European cups for the second consecutive season.

On 9 November 2021, he relinquished his roles as manager and vice president, and left the club by mutual consent.

Bruk-Bet Termalica Nieciecza
On 6 January 2022, Probierz joined another Ekstraklasa club Bruk-Bet Termalica Nieciecza, which were at the time last in the league table. He left the club two days later.

Poland U21
On 4 July 2022, he was announced as the new manager of the Poland under-21 national team, taking over after Maciej Stolarczyk.

Honours

Manager
Jagiellonia Białystok
Polish Cup: 2009–10
Polish Super Cup: 2010

Cracovia
Polish Cup: 2019–20
Polish Super Cup: 2020

Individual
Coach of the Year: 2010
Jagiellonia Białystok all-time best coach: 2010

References

External links

1972 births
Living people
Sportspeople from Bytom
Polish footballers
Ruch Chorzów players
KFC Uerdingen 05 players
SG Wattenscheid 09 players
Górnik Zabrze players
Pogoń Szczecin players
Widzew Łódź players
Ekstraklasa players
Bundesliga players
2. Bundesliga players
Polish football managers
Polish expatriate football managers
Polonia Bytom managers
Widzew Łódź managers
Jagiellonia Białystok managers
ŁKS Łódź managers
Aris Thessaloniki F.C. managers
Wisła Kraków managers
GKS Bełchatów managers
Lechia Gdańsk managers
MKS Cracovia managers
Bruk-Bet Termalica Nieciecza managers
Association football midfielders